Franco Scandurra (27 July 1911 – 15 April 2003) was an Italian actor. He appeared in more than fifty films from 1941 to 1984.

Filmography

References

External links 

1911 births
2003 deaths
Italian male film actors